BS10 may refer to:
BS10, a BS postcode area for Bristol, England
Bonomi BS.10 Ardea, a glider
BS 10 Tables of Pipe Flanges, a British Standard